Asterolasia rupestris is a species of erect shrub that is endemic to New South Wales. It has heart-shaped to triangular leaves with the narrower end towards the base, and densely covered with star-shaped hairs. The flowers are yellow and arranged singly or in groups of three to six in leaf axils or on the ends of branchlets, the back of the petals densely covered with rust-coloured, star-shaped hairs.

Description
The leaves are densely covered with star-shaped hairs, the lower surface with cobwebby hairs. There are ten stamens. Flowering occurs in spring.

Taxonomy
Asterolasia rupestris was first formally described in 2002 by Bryan J. Mole in the journal Muelleria from specimens collected on Mount Kaputar in 1987.

In the same journal, Mole described two subspecies:
 Asterolasia rupestris subsp. recurva that differs from the autonym in having the edges of the leaves turned downwards rather than flat;
 Asterolasia rupestris subsp. rupestris.

Distribution and habitat
This species grows in gullies in low forest. Subspecies rupestris grows on the higher parts of Mount Kaputar and there are old records from Mount Canobolas. Subspecies recurva is only known form Parlour Mountain, north west of Armidale in New South Wales.

Gallery

References

rupestris
Flora of New South Wales
Plants described in 2002